Tan Yuling, Noble Consort Mingxian (born Tatara Yuling; 11 August 1920 – 14 August 1942), was a concubine of China's last emperor Puyi. She married Puyi when the latter was the nominal emperor of the puppet state of Manchukuo during the Second Sino-Japanese War. Her given name "Yuling" is sometimes translated into English as "Jade Years".

Biography
Yuling was born to the prosperous Tatara clan in Beijing. Her father Zhaoxu was a high-ranking warlord who administered the area around Beijing and Tianjin, and her mother, Lady Ok, was a high-ranking Korean courtesan from Hamhung. Yuling's two aunts were in the Guangxu Emperor's harem as Consort Jin and Consort Zhen. Even after the Qing Dynasty fell, the Tatara clan continued to be very prosperous, but they changed their names to Tan, to avoid being discriminated for their Manchu ethnicity.

In early 1937, when Tan was still attending a middle school in Beijing, she was chosen to be a wife of Puyi and she travelled to Manchukuo's capital Hsinking (Changchun). On 6 April, she married Puyi in the Hsinking palace and was given the title of  Imperial Concubine Xiang. She became very close to Puyi after their marriage and in time, she became Noble Consort Xiang and became the manager of the Imperial Harem, as Empress Xiaokemin was not in favour anymore. Yuling reviled the Japanese.

Tan died in 1942 while being treated for cystitis, in less than a day after her Japanese doctor gave her an injection. The circumstances surrounding her death were suspicious because Tan was said to have resented the Japanese for being controlling over Puyi. Kwantung Army staff officer Yoshioka Yasunori (吉岡安則), who was an attaché to the Manchukuo imperial household, once urged Puyi to take a Japanese bride, but Puyi had already married Tan, so he ignored Yoshioka. Yoshioka was said to be unhappy about this. Following Tan's death, Puyi was again pressed by Yoshioka to choose a Japanese spouse, but he refused.

Puyi granted Tan the posthumous title of Noble Consort Mingxian (明賢貴妃) and held a funeral for her in Banruo Temple (般若寺) in Hsinking. After the fall of Manchukuo in 1945, following the Japanese surrender at the end of World War II, Puyi ordered Tan's remains to be cremated and the ashes sent to her relatives in Beijing. Puyi kept a photograph of Tan with him until his death in 1967.

Gallery of Changchun House, Tan Yuling's former residence

Notes

References

External links
 Xuantong Emperor

1920 births
1942 deaths
People from Beijing
Manchu people
Manchukuo royalty
People of the Republic of China
Chinese imperial consorts
Unsolved deaths